Jeanne Rademackers (1862–1920), was a Belgian pharmacist. 

She was the first female pharmacist in Belgium (1885).

References

1862 births
1920 deaths
Belgian pharmacists
Women pharmacists
19th-century Belgian women scientists